The 2010 Rolex 24 at Daytona was the 48th running of the Rolex 24 at Daytona and was the first round of the 2010 Rolex Sports Car Series season. It took place between January 30–31, 2010.

Rule changes
With the increased field size for the 24 Hours of Daytona as compared to other events in the season, some full-time teams had expressed concern that a poor finish in the race could be a serious detriment in their pursuit of the points championship. In response, the sanctioning body decided to place a minimum on the points a driver/team will receive in the race. Thus, any driver/team finishing 15th or worse in class will receive 15th place points (16 points).

Results
The Daytona Prototype Action Express Racing Riley-Porsche took the overall win with drivers João Barbosa, Terry Borcheller, Mike Rockenfeller, and Ryan Dalziel. This was unusual since the Riley-Porsche was powered by a Porsche Cayenne SUV based 5.0 liter V8. Porsche refused to develop the V8 for Grand-Am competition and was, instead, built by the Texas-based Lozano Brothers. Since it was not officially sanctioned by Porsche, the company will not technically claim the win.
Second place in the prototype class was one of the two Chip Ganassi Racing cars. Level 5 Racing's Riley-BMW's finished third overall while the SpeedSource Castrol Mazda RX-8 placed first in the GT class for their 2 win in 3 years for the S. Florida based team, with drivers Sylvain Tremblay, David Haskell, Nick Ham, and Jonathan Bomarito.
Rockenfeller eventually became the first driver since 1988 to win both the 24 Hours of Daytona and the 24 Hours of Le Mans in the same season, with his win aboard an Audi R15 TDI plus (#9 with Timo Bernhard and Romain Dumas) setting a new Le Mans distance record (race report); the Dutch Jan Lammers and the British Andy Wallace of Tom Walkinshaw Racing were the last two drivers to do the same feat.

Race results
Class winners in bold.

References

External links
Entry List

24 Hours of Daytona
Daytona
24 Hours of Daytona